Pyatnitskoye Shosse is a Moscow Metro station in the Mitino District, North-Western Administrative Okrug, Moscow, Russia. It is the northwestern terminus of the Arbatsko-Pokrovskaya Line. The station is located under the intersection of Pyatnitskoye Highway and Mitinskaya street.

The station was opened on 28 December 2012.

The mail hall of the station is curved, there are only five such stations in the Moscow Metro: Alexandrovsky sad, Kutuzovskaya, Mezdunarodnaya and Zyablikovo.

References 

Moscow Metro stations
Railway stations in Russia opened in 2012
Arbatsko-Pokrovskaya Line
Railway stations located underground in Russia